Cluff Apartments, also known as Bennett Apartments and Hillview Apartments, is a historic building in northeastern Salt Lake City, Utah, United States, that is located within the University Neighborhood Historic District, but is individually listed on the National Register of Historic Places (NRHP).

Description
The building was constructed in 1911 for the Cluff Investment Company by W.C.A. Vissing, "one of the most active developers of apartment buildings in Salt Lake City during the pre-World War I period", and designed in the Colonial Revival and Classical Revival styles. It was renamed Bennett Apartments in 1936, twelve years after it was acquired by William H. Bennett and his wife Jennie, and Hillview Apartments in 1947. It has been listed on the National Register of Historic Places since October 20, 1989.

Vissing also was involved with the Cornell Apartments, which are also National Register-listed.

See also

 National Register of Historic Places listings in Salt Lake City

References

External links

	
National Register of Historic Places in Salt Lake City
Colonial Revival architecture in Utah
Neoclassical architecture in Utah
Residential buildings completed in 1911
1911 establishments in Utah